SM UC-13 was a German Type UC I minelayer submarine or U-boat in the German Imperial Navy during World War I. The U-boat was ordered for production on 23 November 1914, laid down on 28 January 1915, and was launched on 11 May 1915. She was commissioned into the German Imperial Navy on 15 May 1915 as SM UC-13. Mines laid by UC-13 in her three patrols were credited with sinking 3 ships.

Design
A German Type UC I submarine, UC-13 had a displacement of  when at the surface and  while submerged. The submarine was powered by one Benz six-cylinder, four-stroke diesel engine producing , an electric motor producing , and one propeller shaft.

UC-13 was fitted with six  mine tubes, twelve UC 120 mines, and one  machine gun. She was built by AG Weser Bremen and her complement was fourteen crew members.

Fate
UC-13 departed Constantinople on 12 November 1915 to operate in the Black Sea. The crew subsequently scuttled UC-13 using demolition charges before being picked up by Turkish vessels.

Summary of raiding history

References

Notes

Citations

Bibliography

 
 

German Type UC I submarines
U-boats commissioned in 1915
World War I submarines of Germany
1915 ships
World War I minelayers of Germany
Ships built in Bremen (state)
Maritime incidents in 1915
U-boats scuttled in 1915
World War I shipwrecks in the Black Sea